Golkan may refer to:
 Golkan, Fars
 Golkan, Sistan and Baluchestan